The Rural Municipality of Lansdowne is a former rural municipality (RM) in the Canadian province of Manitoba. It was originally incorporated as a rural municipality on December 22, 1883. It ceased on January 1, 2015 as a result of its provincially mandated amalgamation with the RM of Glenella to form the Municipality of Glenella – Lansdowne.

The former RM is located west of Lake Manitoba and northeast of the Town of Neepawa.

Communities 
 Arden
 Keyes
 Tenby

Tourism

Landmarks

Cemeteries 
 Arden Cemetery, Arden.

Monuments 
 Arden Crocus Monument, Arden.
 Arden School No. 341, Arden
 Glacial Lake Agassiz Plaque, Arden

Places of interest 
Arden Camp Site, Arden.

References

External links 
 Official website
 Map of Lansdowne R.M. at Statcan

Lansdowne
Populated places disestablished in 2015
2015 disestablishments in Manitoba